Yu Fengtong (born 15 December 1984 in Yichun, Heilongjiang) is a speed skater who has participated in the Olympics for the nation of China.

He is the national recordholder of China on the 500 meters.

Achievements
World Sprint Speed Skating Championships for Men (7 participations):
 2002, 2003, 2004, 2005, 2006, 2008, 2009
 Best result 13th in 2005

Personal records

External links
 DESG

References 

1984 births
Living people
Olympic speed skaters of China
People from Yichun, Heilongjiang
Speed skaters at the 2002 Winter Olympics
Speed skaters at the 2006 Winter Olympics
Speed skaters at the 2010 Winter Olympics
Sportspeople from Heilongjiang
Asian Games medalists in speed skating
Speed skaters at the 2003 Asian Winter Games
Speed skaters at the 2007 Asian Winter Games

Asian Games silver medalists for China
Medalists at the 2007 Asian Winter Games
Universiade medalists in speed skating
Universiade bronze medalists for China
Competitors at the 2009 Winter Universiade